Robert Anthony Holmberg (born June 5, 1971) is a former American football linebacker who played eight seasons in the National Football League. Rob played High School football for Mt. Pleasant Area School, located in Mt. Pleasant, Pennsylvania. He played college football at the U.S. Naval Academy and later at Penn State University and was selected in the seventh round of the 1994 NFL Draft. He currently owns several Denny’s restaurants around the Pittsburgh area.

External links
Career stats

1971 births
American football linebackers
Players of American football from Pennsylvania
Carolina Panthers players
Green Bay Packers players
Indianapolis Colts players
Living people
Los Angeles Raiders players
Minnesota Vikings players
New England Patriots players
New York Jets players
Oakland Raiders players
Penn State Nittany Lions football players
Navy Midshipmen football players